Hope Against Hope is the 1988 debut studio album by Band of Susans, released in 1988 on Blast First. The CD version includes their debut EP Blessing and Curse, which contains "Sometimes" and "Where Have All The Flowers Gone". They were based in New York City.

Track listing

Personnel 
Adapted from Hope Against Hope liner notes.

Band of Susans
 Susan Lyall – electric guitar, backing vocals
 Robert Poss – lead vocals, electric guitar, production
 Alva Rogers – backing vocals
 Ron Spitzer – drums
 Susan Stenger – bass guitar, backing vocals
 Susan Tallman – electric guitar

Production and additional personnel
 Chris Gehringer – mastering
 John Herman – assistant engineer
 Jim Klein – engineering

Charts

Release history

References

External links 
 

1988 debut albums
Band of Susans albums
Blast First albums
Albums produced by Robert Poss